Jeannette Paulson Hereniko is an American film producer, television writer, film festival director and film festival founder. She is best known for founding the Hawaii International Film Festival (HIFF), acting as the festival's director from 1981 to 1996 and her active promotion of Asian cinema in America. She is currently the president of AsiaPacificFilms.com, Te Maka Productions Inc. and the Network for the Promotion of Asian Cinema/USA.

Career
Hereniko began as a television writer and producer for Hawaii Educational Television in 1975. In 1980, she was hired by the East West Center as its Community Relations Officer and Educational Specialist. During this time, she proposed the creation of a public film festival as a public outreach campaign that initiated the Hawaii International Film Festival. Hereniko went on to direct HIFF from 1981 to 1996.

In 1988, she received her MA from the University of Hawaii, focusing on American reception of Asian film.

In 1990, she served as the first director of the Palm Springs International Festival.

In 1996, she created the Network for the Promotion of Asian Cinema/USA (NETPAC/USA) and is currently its President. Also in 1996, she began her tenure as the Director of the Asia Pacific Media Center at the University of Southern California's Annenberg Center for Communication and maintained her position until 2005.

In 2009, she produced the international award-winning feature The Land Has Eyes, written and directed by Vilsoni Hereniko.

She has served on film festival juries in Berlin, Rotterdam, Pusan, Singapore, Mumbai, Brisbane and New Delhi. She is also a rotating member of the Asia Pacific Screen Awards Nomination Council since 2007.

In October 2009, Hereniko created AsiaPacificFilms.com. The website is an online library streaming hundreds of premiere films from Asia and the Pacific. Films are curated by distinguished filmmakers, festival directors and professors (including Philip Cheah, Shaoyi Sun and Aruna Vasudev). Hereniko is currently acting as the website's president.

Awards
 Korean Cinema Award 2009 for lifetime promotion of Korean cinema

References

Living people
American film critics
Year of birth missing (living people)
American film producers
American women film producers
Film festival founders
University of Southern California staff
American women film critics